"Douche and Turd" is the eighth episode of the eighth season of the animated television series South Park, and the 119th episode overall. Written by series co-creator Trey Parker, it first aired on Comedy Central in the United States on October 27, 2004, just before the 2004 presidential election.

In the episode, PETA protests against the use of a cow as South Park Elementary's mascot, causing the student body to hold an election to determine a new mascot. As the election approaches, Kyle tries to convince everyone that his candidate, a giant douche, is better than Cartman's nominee, a turd sandwich. Meanwhile, Stan ends up getting exiled from South Park after refusing to vote.

Plot
During a pep rally at South Park Elementary, a group of local PETA demonstrators protest the use of a cow as the school's mascot. The school agrees to pick a new mascot, and the students are told to vote for a said new mascot. Embarrassed by the bland choices, the kids decide to fill in a joke candidate but disagree as to whether it should be a "giant douche" or a "turd sandwich". Kyle rallies his friends to fill in the giant douche, and Cartman gathers support for the turd sandwich.  The result is that the two joke candidates get the most votes and the students must choose between the two in an election.

Stan does not see the point in voting between a giant douche and a turd sandwich as they are exactly the same in his opinion, and declares that he will not vote at all, much to everyone's dismay. Stan is equally dismayed, wondering why anyone would care about such a pointless exercise. He talks about it with his parents at dinner, but his parents are not impressed with his apathy and even get into a fight over who should win when Stan explains who the two competitors are. This results in Kyle calling on Sean "Puff Daddy" Combs, who intimidates Stan with a literal Vote or Die campaign. Meanwhile, the campaign continues, with the turd sandwich supporters rallying against the giant douche supporters, using bribery and fear mongering to gain support.

By the time of the election, Stan agrees to vote after being chased by Combs and his associates through the streets with guns. However, when he is about to vote for turd sandwich, he realizes Kyle only wanted him to vote in order for the giant douche to win, and Kyle demands that he change his vote. Disgusted with the electoral process, Stan once again refuses to vote. The school administration decides that Stan must be banished from the town for all eternity or until he decides that voting is important. He is literally spat on by the townspeople and his shirt is ripped off piece by piece, before he is placed on a horse, bound with a bucket over his head, and sent off into the woods, much to Stan's irritation about how far they'll go to prove their point, with Butters' father blowing a horn to signal the horse to escort Stan.

Stan's horse randomly takes him to a PETA compound where he finds that PETA's members live closely with animals, practicing zoophilia and even interbreeding with them. Stan explains his banishment to the PETA members, who tell him that an election "is always between a douche and a turd" because they are the only people who suck up enough to make it that far in politics. Combs shows up at the camp to kill Stan, but is distracted by a PETA member who throws a bucket of red paint on his fur coat. Combs and his posse retaliate by gunning down all the PETA members. The animals flee, and Stan manages to escape but gets shot in his arm.

Returning to South Park, Stan is finally convinced to vote and chooses turd sandwich. Despite his vote, giant douche still wins the election, 1,410 to 36. Stan initially points out that his vote did not matter, but his parents inform their son that all votes matter, even if it is for the losing side. Suddenly, Mr. Garrison runs in with the news that the PETA members have been discovered murdered. As a result, the cow is reinstated as South Park Elementary School's mascot. Randy tells Stan that now his vote did not matter, leaving Stan with an appalled expression as he went through so much trouble for nothing.

Reception and release
Slate described the episode as being "the epitome of everything great about the show".

"Douche and Turd", along with the thirteen other episodes from South Parks eighth season, was released on a three-disc DVD set in the United States on August 29, 2006. The set includes brief audio commentaries by series co-creators Trey Parker and Matt Stone for each episode.

Politics 
According to Nick Gillespie of Reason magazine, this episode "pretty much sums up how most libertarians approach politics". Douche and Turd are used again in the season 20 episode "Member Berries" and subsequent episodes of the season, in which they refer to Donald Trump (represented by Mr. Garrison) and Hillary Clinton, respectively, in the 2016 presidential election.

The episode has been used to demonstrate the near-zero value of an individual vote, the intrinsic value individuals place on the act of voting itself, problems arising when voters must choose amongst undesirable candidates rather than issues, and the role of political campaigning.

See also
"Trapper Keeper", a South Park episode about the 2000 U.S. presidential election
"About Last Night...", a South Park episode about the 2008 U.S. presidential election
"Obama Wins!", a South Park episode about the 2012 U.S. presidential election
"Oh, Jeez", a South Park episode about the 2016 U.S. presidential election

References

External links
 "Douche and Turd" Full episode at South Park Studios
 

Eco-terrorism in fiction
People for the Ethical Treatment of Animals
South Park (season 8) episodes
Television episodes about elections
2004 United States presidential election in popular culture
Zoophilia in culture